Mall of Mysore is a shopping mall which is one of the largest and the first of its kind in the Indian city of Mysore, Karnataka. It is located next to the Mysore Race Course with the Chamundi hills as a backdrop.

History
Mall of Mysore is a first-of-its-kind mall in the heritage city of Mysore, the cultural capital of Karnataka. Keeping in pace with the changing perspectives and lifestyles, it is a state of the art building with distinctive architecture and design featuring blends of traditional elements with modern design. It's adjacent to Radisson Blu Plaza Hotel, Mysore, which is one of the first 5 star hotels in Mysore.

Location
Mall of Mysore is located ideally on the New Airport Road where it is surrounded by high-end residential neighbourhoods, the Race Course, the Golf Course and the Famous Mysore Zoo. The mall is home to the Radisson Blu hotel with 140 modern rooms and suites.

Facilities
With a shopping area of around 2,62,000 sq. feet, the Mall of Mysore is anchored by Shoppers Stop, Pantaloon, Unlimited, @home, and Reliance Digital It has a four-screen INOX multiplex, a bowling alley & other games under the Smash group.

Gallery

References

2011 establishments in Karnataka
Shopping malls in Mysore
Shopping malls established in 2011